Charles Reynolds (1873 – after 1895) was an English footballer who played in the Football League for Wolverhampton Wanderers.

References

1873 births
Date of death missing
English footballers
Association football outside forwards
English Football League players
Wolverhampton Wanderers F.C. players